Providence Healthcare can refer to:
Providence Healthcare (Toronto)
Providence Health Care (Vancouver)
Providence Health & Services, United States